Sphenostylis angustifolia, commonly known as the wild sweet-pea, is a species of plant in the family Fabaceae, which is native to grassland regions of southern Africa.

Description
Sphenostylis angustifolia, is a green perennial shrublet with an extensive woody rootstock that decorates the Highveld with its unusual pink flowers that are faintly aromatic. It is one of the many so-called pre-rain flowers which start flowering in early spring irrespective of rainfall.

References

External links

Phaseoleae